Alison Wright (born 2 February 1980) is a track and road cyclist from Australia. She represented her nation at 2002 Commonwealth Games and won a bronze medal in the 3000m Individual Pursuit. She also rode at the 1999, 2002 and 2004 UCI Road World Championships.

References

External links
 profile at Procyclingstats.com

1980 births
Australian female cyclists
Living people
Place of birth missing (living people)
Cyclists at the 2002 Commonwealth Games
Commonwealth Games medallists in cycling
Commonwealth Games bronze medallists for Australia
Medallists at the 2002 Commonwealth Games